Galo Fidian Vásquez Gracia (born 31 December 1957) was an Ecuadorian footballer who plays midfield for Barcelona S.C.

Career

Club 5 de Agosto

1975–1978
Early start at Club 5 de Agosto school until transferred to Barcelona Sporting Club. He was a high school student and the institution involved in local amateur football tournaments.

When Barcelona showed interest in his services came to test his partner Emeterio Vera in 1978. The Peruvian Marcos Calderon (+), whom he remembers as a perfectionist, was the canary team coach and gave the nod for him to stay.

Barcelona Sporting Club

1978–1990
At the "Idolo del Astillero", he was able to achieve 5 national titles and was 3 times runner-up. He did not play the first Copa Libertadores final with Barcelona because there was no agreement with the leadership to renew the contract and had to leave the club.
When twelve years of their retirement has elapsed, the midfielder says that football has left many friends, two houses (one in Guayaquil and one in Esmeraldas), a vehicle and the greatest treasure of which he is very proud: his family.
He does not know why he got the nickname of Mafalda. He just remembers that it was at a friends gathering he was named Mafalda.
Galo ‘Mafalda’ Vásquez en su billar.

Delfín Sporting Club

1990–1991
After that season he retired.

Honors

Club
Barcelona S.C.
Serie A (5): 1980, 1981, 1985, 1987, 1989

References

External links

La Hora 
El Universo 

1957 births
Living people
Sportspeople from Esmeraldas, Ecuador
Association football midfielders
Ecuadorian footballers
Ecuadorian expatriate footballers
Ecuador international footballers
Barcelona S.C. footballers
Delfín S.C. footballers
1987 Copa América players